Owen Joel Dodgson (born 19 March 2003) is an England footballer who plays as a left-back for Rochdale on loan from Burnley.

Career
Born in Lancaster, Lancashire, Dodgson started his career in the Academy at Manchester United eventually progressing to play for the under-18 side after he was offered a two-year scholarship in July 2019. He joined Premier League side Burnley in November 2020 following a successful trial along with Calen Gallagher-Allison, opting to leave Manchester United, stating that the first team pathway at Turf Moor was part of his decision making. On 7 July 2021, he signed his first professional contract for the club along with six other youngsters. His first introduction to senior football was when he was named as an unused substitute for the 2–0 defeat at Anfield to Liverpool on 21 August 2021. Dodgson started to train regularly with the senior squad, impressing with his left footed delivery after also making an impact with the under-23 squad. He made his professional debut on 8 January 2022, when he replaced Dale Stephens as a late substitute in the 2–1 defeat to Huddersfield Town in the FA Cup third round. On 7 July 2022, he signed a new three-year deal with the club having also appeared on the bench five times in the Premier League.

On 27 January 2023, Dodgson joined League Two club Rochdale on loan until the end of the season.

Career statistics

References

 

2003 births
Living people
People from Lancaster, Lancashire
English footballers
Association football fullbacks
Burnley F.C. players
Rochdale A.F.C. players